Dagnall is a village in the parish of Edlesborough, in Buckinghamshire, England.

The place name is derived from the Old English for "Daegga's Knoll". In manorial rolls of 1196 it was listed as Dagenhale.
The spelling Dagenhale appears in a legal record of 1450. Thomas Bradwater is listed as a husbandman of the place.

Dagnall is in the Chiltern Hills and in the Chilterns Area of Outstanding Natural Beauty. It is next to the Ashridge Estate, owned and managed by The National Trust. House prices are significantly higher than average, in common with comparable locations in Hertfordshire, Bedfordshire and Buckinghamshire.

Location
Five main roads link Dagnall with the nearby towns of Dunstable, Leighton Buzzard, Tring, Hemel Hempstead and Berkhamsted, and slightly further on to the larger towns of Luton, Aylesbury and Milton Keynes. 
The nearest villages to Dagnall are Ashridge, Studham and Whipsnade. Whipsnade Zoo is on the hill above the village.

The tripoint of Buckinghamshire, Bedfordshire and Hertfordshire is immediately to the south of Dagnall.

Parish church
All Saints' parish church is a Church of England and Methodist local ecumenical partnership and has clergy from both denominations.

Dagnall C of E School
Dagnall Church of England School is a mixed, community church primary school, which has capacity for 105 pupils and today educates children from the ages of three to eleven.  The school became a voluntary aided church school, under the Diocese of St Albans, in 2016, and changed its name to Dagnall VA C of E School. Dagnall School, as it was then called, opened in 1909.  In 1989 the number of registered pupils at Dagnall County First School, as it was then called, had fallen to just 13 and the school was at risk of closure. This risk came partly from the Education Reform Act 1988 which would introduce a National Curriculum that the school might not have been able to meet. A dedicated campaign saved the school by 1990.

Local amenities
Amenities include one public house and two local farm shops. A further gastro pub is located just north of the village boundary. School buses are provided for children that go to Edlesborough School and Secondary Schools such as The Cottesloe School in Wing. The village falls within the catchment area of the prestigious and renowned Aylesbury Grammar School. There are also private schools nearby. 

A popular convenience store is located in nearby Little Gaddesden. The village is well serviced by a wide variety of the popular supermarkets, located in nearby towns, including Waitrose, Tesco's, Sainsbury's, Morrison's, Aldi, Lidl and more.

The nearest main line railway stations are a short distance away at Tring and Berkhamsted from where you can link to all destinations throughout the UK.  

The nearest international airport London Luton Airport is a 25 minute drive away - Heathrow can be reached within a 30 mins. drive time

The are many entertainment venues and restaurants close by in Tring, Berkhamsted and Hemel Hempstead, with popular theatre's in both Berkhamsted and Tring, with larger theaters in nearby Watford and Milton Keynes. The art deco Rex Cinema can also be found in Berkhamsted. 

The village is located in an area of outstanding natural beauty, adjoining Ashridge Forest to the west (where herds of wild deer roam)  and close to Whipsnade Zoo to its east flank. The Grand Union canal is also not far away. 

The ancientIcknield Way Path passes through the village on its 110-mile journey from Ivinghoe Beacon in Buckinghamshire to Knettishall Heath in Suffolk. The Icknield Way Trail, a multi-user route for walkers, horse riders and off-road cyclists also passes close to the village. The village is also on a popular route for road cyclists of all levels.

Notable residents
Tim Sherwood, a former professional footballer, lives on the edge of the village. He played for Watford, Norwich City, Blackburn Rovers, Tottenham Hotspur, Portsmouth and Coventry City.

Graham Barber, retired FA referee, used to live in the village.

A number of films and television  shows have been filmed around Dagnall, including First Knight, Dinotopia, Humans (TV series), Worzel Gummidge 2019

Recent developments
There have been many improvements made within the village over the last few years, the most notable being the building of a children's play area and a running track around the recreation ground which is located towards the north of the village. There are also plans for the village hall to be extended within the near future.

More recently, red kites have been observed in increasing numbers and have become a common sight in the village.

External links
Dagnall School
History of Dagnall by Mr Geoff Spencer

References

Villages in Buckinghamshire
Aylesbury Vale